The 13 May incident was an episode of Sino-Malay sectarian violence that took place in Kuala Lumpur, the capital of Malaysia, on 13 May 1969. The riot occurred in the aftermath of the 1969 Malaysian general election when opposition parties such as the Democratic Action Party and Gerakan made gains at the expense of the ruling coalition, the Alliance Party. 

Official reports by the government placed the number of deaths due to the riots at 196, although international diplomatic sources and observers at the time suggested a toll of close to 600 while others suggested much higher figures, with most of the victims being ethnic Chinese. The racial riots led to a declaration of a state of national emergency by the Yang di-Pertuan Agong (King), resulting in the suspension of Parliament. A National Operations Council (NOC) was established as a caretaker government to temporarily govern the country between 1969 and 1971.

This event was significant in Malaysian politics as it forced the first Prime Minister Tunku Abdul Rahman to step down from office and hand over the reins to Tun Abdul Razak. Razak's government shifted their domestic policies to favour Malays with the implementation of the New Economic Policy (NEP), and the Malay party UMNO restructured the political system to advance Malay dominance in accordance with the ideology of Ketuanan Melayu ( "Malay Supremacy").

Precursors

Ethnic divide 

On 31 August 1957, Malaya gained its independence from colonial rule. The country however suffered from a sharp division of wealth between the Chinese who dominated most urban areas and were perceived to be in control of a large portion of the country's economy, and the Malays, who were generally poorer and lived in more rural areas. The special privileged position of Malay political power however is guaranteed under Article 153 of the Constitution written during Malayan independence.

There were heated debates between Malay groups wanting radical measures to institutionalise Malay Supremacy (Ketuanan Melayu), while Chinese groups called for their 'racial' interest to be protected, and non-Malay opposition party members argued for a 'Malaysian Malaysia' rather than Malay privilege. Amid an undercurrent of racial tensions, in 1963, Malaysia was formed as a federation that incorporated Malaya (Peninsular Malaysia), Singapore, North Borneo and Sarawak.

There had been several incidents of racial conflict between Malays and Chinese before the 1969 riots. For example, in Penang, hostility between the races turned into violence during the centenary celebration of George Town in 1957 which resulted in several days of fighting and several deaths, and there were further disturbances in 1959 and 1964, as well as a riot in 1967 which originated as a protest against currency devaluation but turned into racial killings. In Singapore, the antagonism between the races led to the 1964 race riots which contributed to the separation of Singapore from Malaysia on 9 August 1965.

1969 national election 
In the 1969 election, the governing coalition the Alliance Party faced a strong challenge from the opposition parties, in particular the two newly formed and mainly Chinese parties Democratic Action Party (DAP) and Parti Gerakan. The election was preceded by outbreaks of racial incidents that contributed to a tense atmosphere. A Malay political worker was killed by a Chinese gang in Penang, while a Chinese Labour Party activist was shot and killed in a clash with police in Kuala Lumpur. Radical opponents called for the boycott of the election and threatened violence, but the funeral procession of the shot activist which drew large crowd was held before the election day passed peacefully with a series of nonfatal incidents.

The general election was held on 10 May 1969, the election day itself passed without any incidents. The result showed that the Alliance had won less than half of the popular vote, a large setback for the ruling coalition. On the national level, the Alliance had gained a majority in the number of seats in the Parliament, albeit a significantly reduced one. The number of seats won by the Chinese component of the Alliance, the Malaysian Chinese Association, had been reduced by half. On the state level, the Alliance had only gained the majority in Selangor by co-operating with the sole independent candidate as the Opposition had tied with the Alliance for control of the Selangor state legislature (although at that time immediately after the election it was unclear that the Alliance would still have control). The Alliance lost control of Kelantan (to PAS) and Perak, and the opposition Gerakan won control of the state government in Penang.

Post-election celebrations 
On the night of 11 and 12 May, the Opposition parties DAP and Gerakan celebrated their success in the election with permission sought by Dr. Tan Chee Khoon from the police. In particular, a large Gerakan procession welcomed the Gerakan leader V. David. The parades by the opposition parties passed through Malay communities such as Kampung Baru were alleged to be highly provocative, with non-Malays taunting Malays while bearing slogans such as: "" (Finish off all the Malays), "" (Kuala Lumpur now belongs to the Chinese). Some supporters of the opposition were said to have driven past the residence of the Selangor chief minister and demanded that he abandon the residence in favour of a Chinese.

The celebrations by the opposition parties were seen as an attack on Malay political power. Although the election results still favoured the Malays despite losses, the Malay newspaper Utusan Melayu suggested in an editorial that the results had jeopardised the future of Malay rule, and that prompt action was required to shore it up. On 12 May members of UMNO Youth indicated to Selangor Menteri Besar Dato' Harun Haji Idris that they wanted to hold a victory parade.

UMNO then announced a procession, which would start from the Harun bin Idris's residence. Tunku Abdul Rahman would later call the retaliatory parade "inevitable, as otherwise the party members would be demoralised after the show of strength by the Opposition and the insults that had been thrown at them". Malays were brought from the rural areas into Kuala Lumpur, which was then a predominantly Chinese city. Thousands of Malays, some of them armed, arrived to join the parade.

Rioting

Early events 
The UMNO procession was planned for the evening at 7.30 pm on Tuesday 13 May. On the morning of 13 May, Malays began to gather at the residence of Selangor Menteri Besar Dato' Harun Haji Idris on Jalan Raja Muda on the edge of Kampung Baru, although some were already there as early as Sunday evening. The Malays came from various parts of Selangor such as Morib (Harun's constituency) and Banting, and some may have came from parts of Perak. According to the NOC official report, at around 6 pm, fist fights broke out in Setapak between a group of Malays from Gombak travelling to the rally and Chinese bystanders who taunted them, and this escalated into bottle and stone throwing. News of the fighting then reached the gathering crowd in Jalan Raja Muda, and shortly before 6.30 pm, many Malays broke off from the rallying point at the Chief Minister's house and headed through adjoining Chinese sections. The Malays, armed with parangs and kris, burned cars and shops, killed and looted in the Chinese areas; according to Time, at least eight Chinese were killed in the initial attack. Once violence broke out, it spread rapidly and uncontrollably throughout the city within 45 minutes, to Jalan Campbell, Jalan Tuanku Abdul Rahman (Batu Road), Kampung Datuk Keramat, Kampung Pandan, Cheras and Kampung Kerinchi.

Retaliations and armed response 
According to John Slimming, who wrote an account of the riot in 1969, the Chinese were taken by surprise and did not retaliate for more than an hour. The NOC official report, however, suggested that Chinese secret society elements had prepared for trouble and were in action when the violence started in Kampung Baru. In Batu Road, Chinese and Indian shopkeepers began to form themselves into an improvised defence force, while a Malay mob attempting to storm the Chow Kit Road area were met with armed secret society gang members and ran. The Chinese attacked Malays who were found in Chinese areas, and Malay patrons in cinemas were singled out and killed. They also attempted to burn down the UMNO headquarters on Batu Road and besieged Salak South Police Station.

Early in the evening the rioters were met by police, who used tear gas in an attempt to control them. A 24-hour curfew for Kuala Lumpur was announced on the radio at 7.35 pm and repeated on television at 8 pm. Later, between 8.30 and 9.00 pm, a shoot-to-kill order was given by Inspector General of Police Mohamed Salleh bin Ismael. This was followed by another shoot-to-kill order from the Chief of Armed Forces, General Tunku Osman Jiwa. The army was deployed and they entered the areas affected by rioting at around 10 pm. Many people who were unaware of the curfew order were shot. Some were also shot while standing in their own doorways and gardens. Foreign correspondents reported seeing members of the Royal Malay Regiment firing into Chinese shop-houses for no apparent reason.

By 5 am the next morning, the authorities at Kuala Lumpur General Hospital reported that there were about 80 dead at the hospital. Members of the hospital staff also reported that the initial casualties between 7 and 8.30 pm had all been Chinese suffering from parang slashes and stab wounds, but that between 8.30 and 10.30 pm the victims were equally divided between Chinese and Malays. However, after about 10.30 pm the casualties were almost all Chinese, with nearly all of them suffering from gunshot wounds.

Later events 
The army gathered at crucial road junctions and patrolled the main streets, but even though a curfew had been announced, young men in areas such as Kampung Baru and Pudu ignored the order. Although most of the killings occurred on Tuesday night and Wednesday morning, the burning and looting of Chinese shops and houses by Malays continued with most incidents of serious arson occurring on Thursday night and Friday.  Over 450 houses were burnt. People displaced by the riots, most of them Chinese, were sent to official refugee centres in different parts of town – the Malays to Stadium Negara, and the Chinese to Stadium Merdeka, Chinwoo Stadium, and Shaw Road School. By Sunday, the number of Chinese refugees had increased to 3,500 in Merdeka Stadium, 1,500 in Chinwoo Stadium, and 800 in Shaw Road School, while the Malays in Stadium Negara had decreased from 650 on Thursday to 250 on Sunday. Over a thousand refugees were still left in Merdeka Stadium a month after the riot.

The curfew was relaxed briefly but quickly reimposed on Thursday morning. It was lifted again for three hours on Saturday morning. The curfew was gradually relaxed as the situation slowly returned to normal, but by the end of the month the curfew was still in force from 3 in the afternoon until 6.30 in the morning.

The violence was concentrated in urban areas, and except for minor disturbances in Malacca, Perak, Penang and neighbouring Singapore, where the populations of Chinese people were similarly larger, the rest of the country remained calm.

On 28 June 1969, rioting broke out again in Sentul when Malays attacked Indians, and 15 were killed.

Casualties 
According to police figures which are disputed, 196 people were killed in the riots. The official figures gave 143 of the dead as Chinese, 25 Malay, 13 Indian, and 15 others (undetermined), although unofficial figures suggested higher number of Chinese deaths.  The police were authorised to bury any dead bodies found or disposed of them any way they could without inquests or inquiries, which made estimation of the number of deaths difficult as many of the dead were disposed of undocumented. Some were reported to have been thrown into the Klang River, and some were believed to have been disposed of in pools in tin mines. A mass burial of the victims was also captured on film at the Sungai Buloh leper colony near Kuala Lumpur. Western diplomatic sources at that time put the toll at close to 600, and John Slimming estimated the number of deaths to be around 800 in the first week by including hundreds who were officially missing, while other observers and correspondents suggested four-figure numbers.

According to official figures 439 individuals were also recorded as injured. 753 cases of arson were logged and 211 vehicles were destroyed or severely damaged.

Immediate effects 
Immediately after the riot, the government assumed emergency powers and suspended Parliament, which would reconvene again only in 1971. It also suspended the press and established a National Operations Council (NOC).

Declaration of emergency 
The government ordered an immediate curfew throughout the state of Selangor. Security forces comprising some 2,000 Royal Malay Regiment soldiers and 3,600 police officers were deployed and took control of the situation.  On 14 and 16 May, a state of emergency and accompanying curfew were declared throughout the country.

On 15 May, the National Operations Council (NOC), also known as the Majlis Gerakan Negara (MAGERAN), headed by Tun Abdul Razak was established following a Proclamation of Emergency by the Yang di-Pertuan Agong (King of Malaysia) Sultan Ismail Nasiruddin Shah. Parts of the constitution were also suspended. With Parliament suspended, the NOC became the supreme decision-making body for the next 18 months. State and District Operations Councils took over state and local governments. The NOC implemented security measures to restore law and order in the country, including the establishment of an unarmed Vigilante Corps, a territorial army, and police force battalions.

Newspaper publications were suspended on 15 May, but resumed on 18 May, and censorship was then applied on 21 May. Foreign publications were banned, citizens found in possession of foreign news clippings were detained, and foreign reporters were criticised over allegations of racial bias by the army. The restoration of order in the country was gradually achieved. Curfews continued in most parts of the country, but were gradually scaled back. Peace was restored in the affected areas within two months. In February 1971 parliamentary rule was re-established. The Proclamation of Emergency and the act enacted (Emergency Ordinance 1969) however were never revoked.

Official assessment 

The NOC released a report on 9 October 1969, and it cited "racial politics" as the primary cause of the riots, but was reluctant to assign blame to the Malays.

It also attributed the cause of the riots in part to both the Malayan Communist Party and secret societies:

It however said that the "trouble turned out to be a communal clash between the Malays and the Chinese" rather than an instance of Communist insurgency. The report also denied rumours of lack of evenhandedness by the security forces in their handling of the crisis.

Tunku Abdul Rahman, in a book released two weeks before the report, blamed the opposition parties for the violence, as well as the influence of the Communists, and thought that the incidents were sparked off by Chinese Communist youths. He absolved the majority of the Malays, Chinese and Indians of any responsibility, and considered the Malays who converged in Kuala Lumpur on May 14 to be merely responding to "intolerable provocations".

Aftermath 
The Rukun Negara, the de facto Malaysian pledge of allegiance, was a reaction to the riot. The pledge was introduced on 31 August 1970 as a way to foster unity among Malaysians.

The Malay nationalist politician Mahathir Mohamad, who was then little-known and lost his seat as an UMNO candidate in the 10 May election, blamed the riot on the government especially the then Prime Minister Tunku Abdul Rahman for being "simple-minded" and not planning for a prosperous Malaysia where the Malays have a share of the economic stake. The Tunku in turn blamed "extremists" such as Mahathir for the racial clashes, which led to the expulsion of Mahathir from UMNO. It propelled Mahathir to write his seminal work The Malay Dilemma, in which he posited a solution to Malaysia's racial tensions based on aiding the Malays economically through an affirmative action programme.

The affirmative action policies included the New Economic Policy (NEP), and the creation of Kuala Lumpur as a Federal Territory out of Selangor state in 1974, five years later.

After the riots, Tunku Abdul Rahman was forced into the background, with the day-to-day running of the country handed to the deputy Prime Minister, Tun Abdul Razak, who was also the director of the National Operations Council. On 22 September 1970 when the Parliament reconvened, the Tunku resigned his position as Prime Minister, and Tun Abdul Razak took over.

In 2007, Kua Kia Soong argued that, based on declassified British Embassy dispatches, the riot was a coup d'état staged against Tunku Abdul Rahman by UMNO political leaders in association with the army and the police.

In an attempt to form a broader coalition, the Barisan Nasional was formed in place of the Alliance Party, with former opposition parties such as Gerakan, PPP, and PAS invited to join the coalition.

After the 1969 riot, UMNO also began to restructure the political system to reinforce its power. It advanced its own version of Ketuanan Melayu whereby "the politics of this country has been, and must remain for the foreseeable future, native [i.e. Malay] based: that was the secret of our stability and our prosperity and that is a fact of political life which no one can simply wish away." This principle of Ketuanan Melayu had been repeatedly used in successive election by UMNO to galvanise Malay support for the party, and it remained the guiding principle of successive governments.

See also 
 1969 race riots of Singapore
 Malaysian New Economic Policy (NEP)
 May 13: Declassified Documents on the Malaysian Riots of 1969
 May 1998 riots of Indonesia, a similar incident
 National Operations Council (NOC)
 Operation Lalang

References

Citations

General sources 
  Official report by the NOC
 
  Book written by an Observer/UK journalist, who was in Kuala Lumpur at the time.
  An account given by the then Prime Minister of Malaysia. Excerpts here
  Paperback reprint (2015) .

External links 
 Kakiseni's review of Dato Jin Shamsuddin’s Kota Idaman 13 Sempadan play in 2004.
 Declassified Documents on the Malaysian Riots of 1969

1960s in Kuala Lumpur
1969 in Malaysia
1969 riots
Ethnic riots
History of Malaysia since Independence
History of Selangor
May 1969 events in Asia
Protests in Malaysia
Riots and civil disorder in Malaysia
Anti-Chinese violence in Asia
Sectarian violence